Peyna Glacier is the 11.4 km long and 3 km wide glacier on Pernik Peninsula, Loubet Coast in Graham Land, Antarctica, situated southwest of Blagun Glacier and northeast of Murphy Glacier.  It flows northwestwards along Lane Ridge, and joins Murphy Glacier and Wilkinson Glacier.

The glacier is named after the settlement of Peyna in Northern Bulgaria.

Location
British mapping in 1976.

Maps
 Antarctic Digital Database (ADD). Scale 1:250000 topographic map of Antarctica. Scientific Committee on Antarctic Research (SCAR). Since 1993, regularly upgraded and updated.
British Antarctic Territory. Scale 1:200000 topographic map. DOS 610 Series, Sheet W 66 66. Directorate of Overseas Surveys, Tolworth, UK, 1976.
 Antarctic Digital Database (ADD). Scale 1:250000 topographic map of Antarctica. Scientific Committee on Antarctic Research (SCAR). Since 1993, regularly upgraded and updated.

References
 Bulgarian Antarctic Gazetteer. Antarctic Place-names Commission. (details in Bulgarian, basic data in English)
 Peyna Glacier. SCAR Composite Antarctic Gazetteer

External links
 Peyna Glacier. Copernix satellite image

Bulgaria and the Antarctic
Glaciers of Loubet Coast